Kizzuwatna (or Kizzuwadna; in Ancient Egyptian Kode or Qode) was an ancient Anatolian kingdom in the 2nd millennium BC. It was situated in the highlands of southeastern Anatolia, near the Gulf of İskenderun, in modern-day Turkey. It encircled the Taurus Mountains and the Ceyhan River. The centre of the kingdom was the city of Kummanni, in the highlands. In a later era, the same region was known as Cilicia.

Land 

The country possessed valuable resources, such as silver mines in the Taurus Mountains. The slopes of the mountain range are still partly covered by woods. Annual winter rains made agriculture possible in the area at a very early date (see Çatalhöyük). The plains at the lower course of the Ceyhan River provided rich cultivated fields.

People 
Several ethnic groups coexisted in the Kingdom of Kizzuwatna. The Hurrians inhabited this area at least since the beginning of the 2nd millennium BC. The Hittite expansion in the early Old Kingdom period (under Hattusili I and Mursili I) was likely to bring the Hittites and the Luwians to southeastern Anatolia. The Luwian language was part of the Indo-European language group, with close ties to the Hittite language. Both the local Hittites and the Luwians were likely to contribute to the formation of independent Kizzuwatna after the weakening of the Hittite Old Kingdom. The toponym Kizzuwatna is possibly a Luwian adaptation of Hittite *kez-udne 'country on this side (of the mountains)', while the name Isputahsu is definitely Hittite and not Luwian (Yakubovich 2010, pp. 273–4). Hurrian culture became more prominent in Kizzuwatna once it entered the sphere of influence of the Hurrian kingdom of Mitanni, with whom they shared various degrees of kinship.

Puduhepa, queen of the Hittite king Hattusili III, came from Kizzuwatna, where she had been a priestess. Their pantheon was also integrated into the Hittite one, and the goddess Hebat of Kizzuwatna became very important in Hittite religion towards the end of the 13th century BC. A corpus of religious texts called the Kizzuwatna rituals was discovered at Hattusa. Believed to be, at present, the earliest Indo-European ritual corpus discovered to date.

History 
King Sargon of Akkad claimed to have reached the Taurus Mountains (the silver mountains) in the 23rd century BC. However, archaeology has yet to confirm any Akkadian influence in the area. The trade routes from Assyria to the karum in the Anatolian Highlands went through Kizzuwatna by the early 2nd millennium BC.

The kings of Kizzuwatna of the 2nd millennium BC had frequent contact with the Hittites to the north. The earliest Hittite records seem to refer to Kizzuwatna and Arzawa (Western Anatolia) collectively as Luwia.

In the power struggle that arose between the Hittites and the Hurrian kingdom of Mitanni, Kizzuwatna became a strategic partner because of its location. Isputahsu made a treaty with Hittite King Telepinu. Later, Kizzuwatna shifted its allegiance, perhaps because of a new ruling dynasty. The city-state of Alalakh, to the south, expanded under its new vigorous leader, Idrimi, himself a subject of the Mitannian king Barattarna. King Pilliya of Kizzuwatna had to sign a treaty with Idrimi. The treaty was for fugitives exchanges between Idrimi and Pilliya.

Pilliya also made peace with the Hittite king Zidanta II, signing a parity treaty between the two.

On Kizzuwatna's north-eastern border, there also existed the state of Ishuwa during this period, that played a political role in the rivalry between Hittites and the Mitanni.

At the time of Kizzuwatna king Shunashura I (Sunassura), the Hittite king Tudhaliya I became more powerful. He concluded a treaty with Sunassura, and took it away from the domination of Mitanni.

His adopted son king Arnuwanda I likely continued the policy of his father. The exceedingly rough and unfavourable terrain of the Tarsus Mountains made it likely that to remain in a position of prominence among their Hurrian- and Luwian- speaking neighbours, the Kizzuwatna requested favourable terms for the treaties, and that they were subsequently granted.

Kizzuwatna rebelled during the reign of Suppiluliuma I but remained in the Hittite Empire for 200 years. In the famous Battle of Kadesh (c. 1274 BC), Kizzuwatna supplied troops to the Hittite king. As master equestrians, some of the first in the areas south of the Caucasus region, they provided the horses, which were later favoured by King Solomon and allowed the more aggressive use of the Hittite chariot than their Egyptian and Assyrian rivals were able.

The Kizzuwatna were master craftsman, mining experts and blacksmiths. Being the first to work "black iron", which is understood to have been iron of meteoric origin, into weapons such as maces, swords and warheads for spears. Their location in the mineral-rich Tarsus Range gave them ample materials from which to work.

Around 1200 BC, an invasion by the Sea Peoples is believed to have temporarily displaced the people of the Cilician plain, but many among the entourage of the Sea peoples were likely to have been composed of Luwian and Hurrians, possibly to ensure that they had a stake in how the invasions ended for their people, rather than being simple victims of them.

After the fall of the Hittite Empire, the Neo-Hittite kingdom Quwe, or Hiyawa, emerged in the area of former Kizzuwatna.

Kings 
 Pariyawatri
 Isputahsu / Išputahšu 
 Paddatisu / Paddatišu
 Pilliya	
 Sunassura I / Šunaššura I
 Talzu
 Sunassura II / Šunaššura II - contemporary of Hittite king Tudhaliya II (c. 1400 BC)

Notes

See also 

 Ancient regions of Anatolia
 Cilicia
 Neo-Hittites

Sources 
 Beckman, Garry M.: Hittite Diplomatic Texts, Scholars Press, Atlanta 1996.
 Götze, Albrecht: Kizzuwatna and the problem of Hittite geography, Yale university press, New Haven 1940.
 Haas, Volkert: Hurritische und luwische Riten aus Kizzuwatna, Butzon & Bercker, Kevelaer 1974.
 Yakubovich, Ilya: Sociolinguistics of the Luvian Language, Brill, Leiden 2010.
 Novák, Mirko: Kizzuwatna, Ḥiyawa, Quwe – Ein Abriss der Kulturgeschichte des Ebenen Kilikien, in J. Becker, R. Hempelmann, E. Rehm (ed.), Kulturlandschaft Syrien – Zentrum und Peripherie.Festschrift für Jan-Waalke Meyer, Alter Orient und Altes Testament 371, Ugarit-Verlag, Münster 2010, pp. 397–425
 Forlanini, Massimo: How to infer Ancient Roads and Intineraries from heterogenous Hittite Texts: The Case of the Cilician (Kizzuwatnean) Road System, KASKAL 10, 2013, pp. 1–34.
 Novák, Mirko and Rutishauser, Susanne: Tutḫaliya, Šunaššura und die Grenze zwischen Ḫatti und Kizzuwatna, in: C. Mittermayer, S. Ecklin (eds.), Altorientalische Studien zu Ehren von Pascal Attinger, Orbis Biblicus et Orientalis 256, Academic Press, Fribourg/Göttingen 2012, pp. 259–269.
 Kozal, Ekin and Novák, Mirko: Facing Muwattalli. Some Thoughts on the Visibility and Function of the Rock Reliefs at Sirkeli Höyük, Cilicia, in: E. Kozal, M. Akar, Y. Heffron, Ç. Çilingiroğlu, T.E. Şerifoğlu, C. Çakırlar, S. Ünlüsoy and E. Jean (eds.), Questions, Approaches, and Dialoguesin the Eastern Mediterranean Archaeology Studies in Honor of Marie-Henriette and Charles Gates, Alter Orient und Altes Testament 445, Ugarit-Verlag, Münster 2017, pp. 371–388.
 Novák, Mirko and Rutishauser, Susanne: Kizzuwatna: Archaeology. In: M. Weeden und L.Z. Ullmann (ed.), Hittite Landscape and Geography. Handbuch der Orientalistik I,121, Brill, Leiden 2017, pp. 134–145.
 Kozal, Ekin and Novák, Mirko: Alalakh and Kizzuwatna. Some Thoughts on the Synchronization, in: Ç. Maner, A. Gilbert, M. Horowitz (ed.), Overturning Certainties in Near Eastern Archaeology, A Festschrift in Honor of K. Aslıhan Yener for her 40 years of Field Archaeology in the Eastern Mediterranean, Brill, Leiden 2017, pp. 296–317.

 
States and territories established in the 2nd millennium BC
States and territories disestablished in the 2nd millennium BC
Ancient Cilicia
States in Bronze Age Anatolia
Former kingdoms
Former countries in Western Asia
2nd millennium BC
Hittite Empire
Hurrians